Dorcadion triste is a species of beetle in the family Cerambycidae. It was described by Imre Frivaldszky in 1845.

Subspecies
 Dorcadion triste phrygicum Peks, 1993
 Dorcadion triste triste Frivaldszky, 1845

References

triste
Beetles described in 1845